Mehdi Jelodarzadeh Sedei  (born 8 September 1978) is a retired Iranian athlete who specialised in the 800 metres. He represented his country at the 2000 Summer Olympics failing to reach the semifinals.

His personal best in the event is 1:47.8 from 2000.

Competition record

References

 

Living people
1978 births
Iranian male middle-distance runners
Olympic athletes of Iran
Athletes (track and field) at the 2000 Summer Olympics
Athletes (track and field) at the 1998 Asian Games
Athletes (track and field) at the 2002 Asian Games
Asian Games competitors for Iran